Amann is a German surname. Notable people with the surname include:

Anton Amann (1956–2015), Austrian chemist
Betty Amann (1905–1990), German-American actress
Chris Amann, a doctor for the WWE
Diane Marie Amann, American legal scholar
Gregor Amann (born 1962), German politician (SPD)
Herbert Amann (1919–1944), German Wehrmacht officer and Iron Cross recipient
James Amann (born 1956), American politician
Jules Amann (1859-1939), Swiss botanist and pharmacist
Jürg Amann (1947–2013), Swiss writer and dramatist
Max Amann (1891–1957), German Nazi politician, journalist and SS general
Max Amann (water polo) (1905–1945), German water polo player
Melanie Amann (born 1978), German journalist
Urs Amann, Swiss painter (1951–2019), Swiss painter

See also
Aman (disambiguation)

German-language surnames
Surnames of German origin